Fredrick Lawrence Grandy (born June 29, 1948) is an American actor who played "Gopher" on the sitcom The Love Boat and who later became a member of the United States House of Representatives from the state of Iowa. Grandy was most recently the host of The Grandy Group, a morning drive time radio talk show on 630 WMAL in Washington, D.C.

Early life
Grandy was born in Sioux City, Iowa, the youngest of three sons of William Grandy, who worked in his father's insurance business, and his wife Bonnie. When Grandy was eleven, his father died of a heart attack. His mother died of an aneurysm a year later.

The young Grandy was then raised by Margaret Avery, his mother's best friend (a widow who later married his father's doctor). He went to public schools until ninth grade, after which he attended high school at Phillips Exeter Academy in Exeter, New Hampshire, as his father and brothers had done.

At Exeter, Grandy was the roommate of David Eisenhower, the grandson of President Dwight D. Eisenhower, and was later best man at Eisenhower's wedding to Julie Nixon, the daughter of then–president-elect Richard Nixon, in December 1968.

Grandy graduated magna cum laude with a bachelor's degree in English studies from Harvard University in 1970. In 1971, he joined an improvisational group at Harvard called "The Proposition" and then rejoined the show when it moved off-Broadway in 1971.  Among his co-stars was future Saturday Night Live star Jane Curtin.

Although of service age, Grandy had a high lottery number and was not drafted for Vietnam.

Acting career
Grandy played purser Burl "Gopher" Smith on the American television series The Love Boat. The series aired for nine seasons (1977–86). He also wrote several vignettes for the show. In 1982, while visiting Turkey to film scenes for the show, Grandy suffered severe burns when a balloon filled with hydrogen exploded.

Before gaining prominence on The Love Boat, Grandy had guest roles on many shows, including Love, American Style (1969); The Mary Tyler Moore Show (1970); Maude (1973); Phyllis (1975); and Welcome Back, Kotter (1975). Grandy also acted in the 1973 made-for-TV movie The Girl Most Likely to..., as Ted Gates.

He starred in the Saturday morning TV series Monster Squad (1976) as Walt, a criminology student working as a night watchman at "Fred's Wax Museum". He also appeared in a number of Match Game episodes in the late 1970s. He usually sat in the male guest-star seat in the top row left.

In May 2013 Grandy returned to the stage, starring in a production of Sleuth at the Surflight Theatre in Beach Haven, New Jersey. In 2014 Grandy had a recurring role on Season 3 of The Mindy Project for which his son, Charlie Grandy, is a writer. He portrayed Dr. William Ledreau. He has also had recurring roles in 3 TV series, The Mindy Project, Knight Squad, and the upcoming Sprung. He has also performed around the country in regional theatre productions of How to Succeed in Business Without Really Trying, On Golden Pond, I'm Not Rappaport, and Give 'em Hell, Harry!.

Grandy holds a master of fine arts (MFA) degree from the Washington Shakespeare Theatre and George Washington University.

Political career
Grandy's political interests preceded his acting career. Between 1970 and 1971 he served as a speechwriter for Wiley Mayne, the Republican congressman from his home district, .

With Mayne's successor, Democrat Berkley Bedell, deciding not to run in 1986, Grandy, a Republican, campaigned for the open Iowa United States House of Representatives seat, beating Clayton Hodgson by two percentage points (51.0% to 49.0%).

Although Grandy tried to distance himself from his acting career (at the time), he said to People magazine that "if there were no Gopher, there would be no Fred Grandy for Congress."

During his four terms in Congress, he served on a variety of committees, including Ways and Means, Agriculture, Standards of Official Conduct, and Education and the Workforce. While a member of Congress, Grandy won eight "Watchdog of the Treasury" awards.

In 1994, Grandy declined to run for another Congressional term and instead entered the Republican primary race for governor of Iowa against incumbent Terry Branstad, but lost the election by nearly four percentage points.

Career as a radio commentator and other work
Grandy served as president and CEO of Goodwill Industries International from 1995 to 2000. He later became a political commentator for National Public Radio and served as a visiting professor teaching a course on nonprofit organizations at the School of Public Affairs at the University of Maryland, College Park.

From 2003 to 2010, Grandy and radio veteran Andy Parks were the hosts of The Grandy & Andy Morning Show, a conservative radio talk show on 630 WMAL in Washington, D.C. In May 2010, the program was reconfigured and was afterward called The Grandy Group. On March 3, 2011, Grandy resigned from the program allegedly over a dispute about his and his wife's statements about Islamic extremism or low listenership.

Grandy was also the host of a show on Retirement Living TV called Daily Café (with MSNBC anchor Alex Witt). Since then he has been a Senior Fellow for National Security Affairs at the Washington-based Center for Security Policy, a far-right, anti-Muslim, Washington, D.C.-based think tank, developing and managing projects on domestic terrorism and counterintelligence.

Personal life
Grandy has been married twice. He married Jan Gough in 1969, a student at Radcliffe, but they were divorced in 1983.  A son, Charlie Grandy, and a daughter were born to that union. On March 28, 1987, Grandy married romance novelist Catherine Mann, whom he had met when she interviewed him as one of the first reporters for Entertainment Tonight. They have one daughter (born 1989). In 1993, Grandy and his wife sporadically toured Iowa with a stage production of the play Love Letters for charity (especially children's charities).

Filmography

References

External links

 Interview with Fred Grandy by Stephen McKiernan, Binghamton University Libraries Center for the Study of the 1960s, November 11, 1996

1948 births
Living people
20th-century American male actors
American actor-politicians
American male television actors
American talk radio hosts
Harvard College alumni
George Washington University alumni
Phillips Exeter Academy alumni
Politicians from Sioux City, Iowa
Republican Party members of the United States House of Representatives from Iowa
Actors from Sioux City, Iowa
United States congressional aides
Members of Congress who became lobbyists